I Am Jose (foaled October 8, 2008) is a Tennessee Walking Horse stallion and three-time World Grand Champion. He is the first stallion and second horse to win the World Grand Championship three times. I Am Jose is black with a star on his forehead.

Life and career

I Am Jose was foaled on October 8, 2008 near Franklin, North Carolina. He is a black stallion with a star on his forehead, sired by Jose Jose and out of Pride's Angelique. He was bred by Robert Rollins and sold to Billy and Debbie Woods of Lexington, Tennessee on February 14, 2011. The Woods put him in training with Casey Wright of Reagan, Tennessee. 
In 2013, Wright entered I Am Jose in the Tennessee Walking Horse National Celebration, where he won the four-year-old World Championship. Wright and the Woods made the decision to enter I Am Jose in the open World Grand Championship, which he won.
I Am Jose won a second World Grand Championship in 2014, and a third just after midnight on September 6, 2015. I Am Jose is the first stallion to win three World Grand Championships and only the second horse ever to do so; the first was the gelding The Talk of the Town in 1951, 1952 and 1953. I Am Jose is the first repeat winner since Go Boy's Shadow in 1955 and 1956.  His winning entry was his only show appearance in 2015, and his owners did not comment on whether it was the last of his career.  Of note was that the Celebration has very strict inspection standards to prevent soring and I Am Jose passed. His trainer explained in 2014, "that's why we took him up there. We ain't got nothing to hide."
Following the 2015 show season, the Walking Horse Trainers' Association named I Am Jose Horse of the Year in their stallions  and over division.

Between show seasons, he also stood at stud each fall after his championships and again between March and June, returning to show conditioning about a month prior to competition. It was this ability to switch focus from breeding to showing that was viewed as particularly impressive.

Pedigree

† denotes inbreeding.

References

Individual Tennessee Walking Horses
2008 animal births
World Grand Champion Tennessee Walking Horses